Chapakot is a village and Village Development Committee  in Kaski District in the Gandaki Zone of northern-central Nepal. At the time of the 1991 Nepal census it had a population of 2,966 persons residing in 574 individual households.

References

External links
UN map of the municipalities of Kaski District

[chapakot village]

Populated places in Kaski District
Nepal municipalities established in 2014